Dana House may refer to:

in the United States
(by state then city)
Dana Adobe, Nipomo, California, listed on the National Register of Historic Places (NRHP)
James Dwight Dana House, New Haven, Connecticut, NRHP-listed
Susan Lawrence Dana House, Springfield, Illinois, a Frank Lloyd Wright house, NRHP-listed
Dana-Palmer House, Cambridge, Massachusetts, NRHP-listed
Dana House (Lebanon, New Hampshire), Lebanon, New Hampshire, listed on the New Hampshire State Register of Historic Places
Dana Meeting House, New Hampton, New Hampshire, NRHP-listed
Marcus Dana House, Fostoria, Ohio, listed on the NRHP in Hancock County, Ohio
Marshall Dana House, Milwaukie, Oregon, listed on the NRHP in Clackamas County
George and Mary Agnes Dana House, Fond du Lac, Wisconsin, listed on the NRHP in Fond du Lac County

See also
Richard Henry Dana Branch, Los Angeles, California, a library branch, NRHP-listed